Vladimer (Lado) Kakhadze (born 28 October 1953) is a Georgian politician and doctor. He was chair of Tbilisi City Assembly from 1998 to 2002. Member of Parliament of Georgia since 2019.

Biography 
 Clinic "Mzera", Radiology doctor (2015–2019)
 "Oxford Medical Georgia" Ltd. Radiology doctor (2012–2015)
 JSC "Clinic of My Family", Echoscopy doctor (2006–2013)
 "La Fortunado" Ltd. Consultant (2002–2006)
 Tbilisi City Assembly, Chairman (1998–2002)
 Medical Firm "La Fortunado" Ltd. President (1993–1998)
 Cooperative "Family and Health", Echoscopy doctor (1992–1993)
 Republican Diagnostic Center, Echoscopy doctor (1988–1992)
 Ultrasonic Diagnostics Office, Chief (1987–1988)
 Tbilisi State Medical Institute, Senior Laboratory Assistant (1982–1987)
 Tbilisi State Medical Institute, Department of the Obstetrics-Gynecology, Clinical Intern (1979–1981)
 Tbilisi N1 Clinical Hospital, Intern (1972–1979)
 Tbilisi Doctors' Training and Qualification Institute, Clinic, Orderly (1971–1972)

References

External links 
 Parliament of Georgia

1953 births
Living people
Members of the Parliament of Georgia
21st-century politicians from Georgia (country)